Kiley Joy Gaffney is an Australian rock musician and performance artist. Before signing to Warner (WEA) in 1995, she worked in theatre (acting and singing) and the art world (performance).

She released two albums with Warner, Bitter Fluff (August 1997) and Sweet Meat(early 2001), writing and playing most of the instruments on the former and writing, producing and playing everything on the latter.

Outspoken and ardently political, Gaffney completed a PhD and then worked as an academic at Queensland University of Technology.

Personal life 

Gaffney has lived with Paul Curtis, a talent manager, since 1994 – the couple were introduced by Regurgitator's Quan Yeomans, her label mate and managed by Curtis. Gaffney and Curtis have two children.

Publications

Discography

Albums 

 Bitter Fluff (August 1997)
 Sweet Meat(early 2001)

Extended plays 

 Punk Rok Chik (1996)

Singles 

 "Postman" (1996)

References

Further reading 
  Note: [on-line] version established at White Room Electronic Publishing Pty Ltd in 2007 and was expanded from the 2002 edition.

Australian stage actresses
Australian women singers
Australian educators
Living people
Year of birth missing (living people)
Australian performance artists
Australian women artists